Trevor Levin is an Australian former rugby league footballer who played in the 1960s.

Playing career
Levin was a reserve grade prop-forward with St. George.Levin won a reserve grade premiership with St.George in 1964. He is remembered as the replacement for Robin Gourley in the victorious team that won the 1966 Grand Final.   

He left Saints the following year to join Cronulla-Sutherland.  Levin played at Cronulla for three years between 1967-1969.

References

St. George Dragons players
Cronulla-Sutherland Sharks players
Australian rugby league players
Living people
Year of birth missing (living people)
Rugby league props